Kaskinovo (Qasqın) is a rural locality (a village) in Sanzyapovsky Selsoviet, Kugarchinsky District, Bashkortostan, Russia. The population was 164 as of 2010. There are 2 streets.

Geography 
Kaskinovo is located 45 km southwest of Mrakovo (the district's administrative centre) by road. Verkhnesanzyapovo is the nearest rural locality.

References 

Rural localities in Kugarchinsky District